Ilya Spiegel (Russian: Илья Шпигель; born August 24, 1975 in Leningrad, USSR) is a Finnish politician, the founder and leader of the New Europeans movement in Finland. He ran for Parliament of Finland in 2011 as an opposition to nationalist movements gaining power and popularity among Finnish voters. He belongs to the Swedish People's Party of Finland.

Personal background

Spiegel has both Russian and Finnish citizenship. He moved to Finland in 1992 and graduated from Åbo Akademi University as an economist. The first language he learned in Finland was Swedish. Ilya Spiegel speaks five languages and works for international manufacturing corporations as a specialist in foreign trade and FDI, he is a board member of several cultural NGOs. He gives lectures at schools, universities and enterprises as an expert in international marketing and multicultural issues.

Political career

Spiegel has been politically active in Finland and the EU as a member of the Swedish People's Party of Finland (RKP) since the end of the 1990s. In recent times the RKP has lost support due to the diminishing Swedish-speaking population in Finland and the growing popularity of the biggest parties. But being a party of a minority by nature, it is interested to represent and advocate all language minorities, and so Spiegel founded a political movement to represent the interests of all language minorities. The name of the movement in Finland is Uussuomalaiset (New Finns). But since language minorities are numerous around Europe, "New Europeans" has been chosen for the international name.

References

External links
 Official website

Swedish People's Party of Finland politicians
Living people
1975 births
Finnish people of Russian descent
Russian expatriates in Finland
Åbo Akademi University alumni
Naturalized citizens of Finland